Giannis Fakkis (born 14 April 2001) is a Greek professional footballer who plays as a forward for Super League 2 club Thesprotos.

Career statistics

Club

Notes

References

External links
Giannis Fakkis at xanthifc.gr

2001 births
Living people
Greek footballers
Greece youth international footballers
Association football forwards
Xanthi F.C. players
Footballers from Serres